Juanjo Puigcorbé (born 22 July 1955) is a Spanish actor. He has appeared in over 100 films and television shows since 1977. He starred in the 1993 film The Window Over the Way, which was entered into the 44th Berlin International Film Festival. 

He ran in the Republican Left of Catalonia list to the 2015 Barcelona municipal election (second to Alfred Bosch) and became a city councillor.

Partial filmography

 L'orgia (1978) - Joan
 Salut i força al canut (1979) - Juan
 Barcelona sur (1981) - Encuestador
 Un genio en apuros (1983) - Camarero
 Últimas tardes con Teresa (1984) - Luis
 La noche más hermosa (1984) - Himself
 La vaquilla (1985) - Alférez
 Pasión lejana (1986) - Ángel
 Mi general (1987) - Capitán Eusebio Pujol
 Barrios altos (1987) - Luis
 Material urbà (1987) - Andreu
 La diputada (1988) - Albors
 Amanece como puedas (1988) - Miquel
 El acto (1989) - Andrés
 Cómo ser mujer y no morir en el intento (1991) - Mariano
 Ho sap el ministre? (1991) - Jordi López
 Salsa rosa (1992) - Tomás
 Un paraguas para tres (1992) - Daniel
 La reina anónima (1992) - Marido
 The Diary of Lady M (1993) - Diego / painter
 Rosa rosae (1993) - Teo-Doro
 Mal de amores (1993) - Mario
 The Window Over the Way (1993, TV Series) - Adil Bey
 Una chica entre un millón (1994) - Miguel
 Mi hermano del alma (1994) - Toni
 Todos los hombres sois iguales (1994) - Joaquín
 Justino, un asesino de la tercera edad (1994) - Empresario
 El somni de Maureen (1995) - Arístides / Albert
 Boca a boca (1995) - Actor en el video del Casting (uncredited)
 Amores que matan (1996) - Marcos
 Gran Slalom (1996) - Manuel
 El dedo en la llaga (1996) - Ángel
 Mirada líquida (1996) - Antonio
 Love Can Seriously Damage Your Health (1997) - Santi Garcia
 Corazón loco (1997) - Félix
 Airbag (1997) - Jugador timba
 No se puede tener todo (1997) - Jordi
 Suerte (1997) - Berasategui
 Al límite (1997) - Javier
 The Naked Eye (1998) - Ramón
 Novios (1999) - Arturo
 Amnèsia (2002) - Xavier
 Besos de gato (2003) - Fran
 Trileros (2003) - Julio
 Inconscientes (2004) - Dr. Mira
 Bala perdida (2007) - Daniel
 Rivales (2008) - Fernando
 La Conjura de El Escorial (2008) - Felipe II
 The Disciple (2010) - Pilate
 La chispa de la vida (2011) - Álvaro Aguirre
 Ni pies ni cabeza (2012) - General Yanes
 La venta del paraíso (2012) - Olivetti
 Sonata per a violoncel (2015) - Rovira
 Juegos de familia (2016) - Andrés
 Barcelona 1714 (2019) - Bastiaan Van Kroeg

References

External links

1955 births
Living people
Spanish male film actors
Male actors from Barcelona
Barcelona municipal councillors (2015–2019)
Spanish male television actors
20th-century Spanish male actors
21st-century Spanish male actors
Male film actors from Catalonia
Male television actors from Catalonia